The small eye golden-line fish (Sinocyclocheilus microphthalmus) is a species of ray-finned fish in the family Cyprinidae.
It is found only in China.

References

microphthalmus
Fish described in 1989
Taxonomy articles created by Polbot